Roy Edward Richter (March 16, 1914 – July 28, 1983) was an American businessman who founded Bell Helmets and Cragar Industries.

Early life, family, and education
Richter was born to Otto and Cora Richter in the small town of Dupo, Illinois. Dupo sits across from St. Louis, Missouri on the Mississippi River. Roy's brother Melbourne was also born in Dupo in 1912. Roy's father was from Germany and his mother was of English, Irish, and French descent. The couple lived in Missouri before moving to Dupo. The family had many relations involved in the railroad industry. Dupo had one of the largest railroad switching yards in the country. It included a huge re-icing depot until refrigerated railroad cars became common.

The family moved to St. Louis immediately after Roy was born. Otto moved the family again in 1922, this time to California, in search of better weather and better job opportunities. They briefly lived in Bell upon arriving in California before moving again to  Maywood. Both cities are suburbs of Los Angeles located about six miles from downtown. Otto found work as an ice deliveryman but also pursued many business ventures such as real estate and mining. Roy spent the next few decades of his life in the Los Angeles area.

Roy attended Bell High School and graduated in 1933. He spent as much class time as possible on subjects like auto shop and mechanical drawing. During high school Richter joined the Pacific Glider Club. The club met weekly at  Seal Beach to full-size, manned gliders. During a flight Richter hit power lines during his landing approach and crashed. He was lucky to suffer only minor injuries. This was his final glider flight. Roy maintained lifetime relationships with many of his schoolmates, some of whom even went on to become his employees.

Using earnings from odd jobs and money from his father, Richter purchased his first motorcycle in 1931. It was a 45" Indian Scout. Richter made many trips to Muroc Dry Lake on this motorcycle. During the 1920s and 1930s the lake was a popular meeting spot for automobile and motorcycle enthusiasts. The lake is currently home to Edwards Air Force Base.

Career
He began his career after graduating high school by going to work at Bell Auto Parts store in Bell, California, a suburb of Los Angeles. At that time he took an interest in auto racing in 1933. For a short time he was a professional auto racer, but came to realize his talents were more of building race cars and racing products than racing them. His cars in numerous racing divisions won hundreds of races, setting many track records and taking many victorious championships. 

In 1945, he sold his car and spent all he had to buy Bell Auto Parts for $1000. His auto parts store was said to be the county's first speed shop. And he is also known for bringing to market the Cragar custom stainless steel wheel. In 1946, after the death of the second close friend by a racing accident, he devoted more of his life to creating safer racing products. In 1949, with the start of the Bonneville National Speed Trials he was there selling spare parts and also provided shade for contestants; he did this for 30 years.

A short time after he bought Bell Auto Parts, one of Roy Richter's friends was killed in a racing accident. Richter had already witnessed many racing accidents and was already turning his attention to improving safety, but with a focus mainly improving track conditions. He soon began to focus on helmets.

Bell Helmets
In 1954, in a garage behind his auto parts store, he began manufacturing his first helmets called the '500'. There went on to have numerous racers to wear his helmets. Many stated after crashes that his helmet saved them from serious injury. Even Evel Knievel stated his Bell helmet helped save his life after his crash at Caesars Palace. His Bell Helmet company would go on to provide helmets to over 800 police departments for motorcycle officers and also became the official provider to the US Ski Team. He is credited with producing the first full-face motorcycle helmet in 1968, the Star, and in 1971 the first full-face off-road motorcycle helmet. His company was credited with producing the first effective bicycle helmet in 1978, the Bell Biker.

SEMA
In 1967, he helped in forming SEMA, the automotive aftermarket trade group. He was inducted into the SEMA Hall of Fame in 1975.

Late life and death
In 1980, he retired at the age of 63. Richter died on July 28, 1983, after his second heart bypass surgery from complications at the age of 66.

References

1914 births
1983 deaths
American company founders
Helmet manufacturers
People from St. Louis